Frederich Christopher, Count of Trampe (19 June 1779 – 18 July 1832) was a Danish-Norwegian count, civil servant and politician.

Biography
Trampe was born at Krabbesholm in Jutland, Denmark. His parents were Adam Frederich, Count of Trampe (1750-1807)  and Gertrud Hoffmand de Poulson (1746–1815). Frederich's father belonged to an originally Pomeranian noble family, whose noble status had been naturalised in Denmark and Norway.

Frederik Trampe was enrolled at the University of Copenhagen in 1794   and graduated as a cand.jur. in 1798. He became so enrolled at the University of Kiel during 1801 and awarded Ph.D. in 1804.

He became deputy judge at Lolland and Falster from 1800, before making a brief military career in the Danish Army. He served as governor of  Iceland from 1804. In 1810 he came to Norway as County Governor of Søndre Trondhjems amt (now Sør-Trøndelag). He held this position until his death in 1832.

In Trondhjem (now Trondheim) he was a member of the Royal Norwegian Society of Sciences and Letters, serving as praeses in 1832 right before his death. He was a Knight of the Order of the Dannebrog in 1811, Knight of the Order of the Polar Star in 1818, and Commander of the Order of the Polar Star in 1825.

Personal life
Trampe was married three times: In 1797, to Sophie Frederikke Heinrich (1764–1807); In  1808 to Anna Dorothea Colbjørnsen (1792–1808). She died just five months after the wedding; In 1810,  with Amalia Ulrica Frederike Schmettau (1790–1856).
He was the father of several children, including Adam Johan Frederik Poulsen Trampe, Count of Trampe (1798–1876) who served as County Governor of Nordlands amt  and of Nordre Trondhjems amt.

Trampe died at  Rotvoll in Trondheim and was buried at Lade Church.

See also
 Danish nobility
 Norwegian nobility

References

Literature and sources
  Frederik Christopher Trampe Store norske leksikon 
  Frederik Trampe   Norsk biografisk leksikon

1779 births
1832 deaths
Danish counts
Danish emigrants to Norway
County governors of Norway
Sør-Trøndelag politicians
Royal Norwegian Society of Sciences and Letters
Knights of the Order of the Dannebrog
Commanders of the Order of the Polar Star
University of Copenhagen alumni
University of Kiel alumni